Argile was a French poetry and art magazine, which was published between 1973 and 1981 in Paris, France.

History and profile
Argile was founded by Aimé Maeght in Paris in 1973. The magazine ceased publication after its 24th issue in 1981. Claude Esteban edited the magazine.

Portuguese poet Antonio Ramos Rosa is among the former contributors to the magazine.

References

External links
An article in French about the history of the magazine.

1973 establishments in France
1981 disestablishments in France
Defunct literary magazines published in France
Argile (magazine)
French-language magazines
Magazines established in 1973
Magazines disestablished in 1981
Magazines published in Paris
Argile (magazine)